In the run up to the 2000 Spanish general election, various organisations carried out opinion polling to gauge the opinions that voters hold towards political leaders. Results of such polls are displayed in this article. The date range for these opinion polls is from the previous general election, held on 3 March 1996, to the day the next election was held, on 12 March 2000.

Preferred Prime Minister
The table below lists opinion polling on leader preferences to become Prime Minister.

Aznar vs. Almunia

Aznar vs. Borrell

Aznar vs. González

Predicted Prime Minister
The table below lists opinion polling on the perceived likelihood for each leader to become Prime Minister.

Aznar vs. Almunia

Aznar vs. Borrell

Aznar vs. González

Leader ratings
The table below lists opinion polling on leader ratings, on a 0–10 scale: 0 would stand for a "terrible" rating, whereas 10 would stand for "excellent".

Approval ratings
The tables below list the public approval ratings of the leaders and leading candidates of the main political parties in Spain.

José María Aznar

Joaquín Almunia

Felipe González

Julio Anguita

References

2000 elections in Spain
2000